Tom Hutchesson (born 11 July 2000) is an Australian rules footballer who played for the Greater Western Sydney Giants in the Australian Football League (AFL). He was recruited by the Greater Western Sydney Giants with the 65th draft pick in the 2019 AFL draft.

Early football
Tom Hutchesson played local football for the Millicent Football Club in the Western Border Football League. He helped the club win their first senior premiership in 34 years. In 2019, Hutchesson was invited to play for the Adelaide Crows in the South Australian National Football League (SANFL). He played 14 games and kicked 3 goals, and averaged 14 disposals a game.

AFL career
On debut, Hutchesson kicked one behind, collected 7 disposals, 2 marks and a tackle. Hutchesson was delisted at the conclusion of the 2021 season.

Statistics
 Statistics are correct to the end of 2020

|- style="background-color: #EAEAEA"
! scope="row" style="text-align:center" | 2020
|style="text-align:center;"|
| 20 || 1 || 0 || 1 || 4 || 3 || 7 || 2 || 1 || 0.0 || 1.0 || 4.0 || 3.0 || 7.0 || 2.0 || 1.0
|- style="background:#EAEAEA; font-weight:bold; width:2em"
| scope="row" text-align:center class="sortbottom" colspan=3 | Career
| 1
| 0
| 1
| 4
| 3
| 7
| 2
| 1
| 0.0
| 1.0
| 4.0
| 3.0
| 7.0
| 2.0
| 1.0
|}

References

External links

1995 births
Living people
Greater Western Sydney Giants players
Australian rules footballers from South Australia